Keith Ripp (born November 13, 1961) is a Wisconsin politician.

Ripp was born in Madison, Wisconsin and was raised in Lodi. He graduated from Lodi High School in 1980, and took farming courses from the University of Wisconsin–Madison.

Ripp continues to run the family farm in northern Dane County, Wisconsin. He is a former president of the Wisconsin Soybean Marketing Board and the Wisconsin Corn Growers Association.

Ripp served as a supervisor for the Town of Dane from 2006 to 2009. He was elected to the Wisconsin State Assembly in 2008. Ripp resigned from the Assembly on December 29, 2017, to become the assistant deputy secretary of the Wisconsin Department of Agriculture, Trade and Consumer Protection.

References

External links
Official assembly webpage
Campaign website

Living people
University of Wisconsin–Madison College of Agricultural and Life Sciences alumni
1961 births
Politicians from Madison, Wisconsin
21st-century American politicians
People from Lodi, Wisconsin
People from Dane County, Wisconsin
Republican Party members of the Wisconsin State Assembly